Andrew John Saint (born November 1946) is an English architectural historian and Professor at the Bartlett School of Architecture, University College, London.

Saint worked as the architectural editor of the Survey of London (1974–86) and then as a historian for Historic England (then known as English Heritage) 1986–95.

He lectured in the Department of Architecture at the University of Cambridge and at University College London from May 2006.

While General Editor of the Survey of London Saint was co-author of the volumes on Battersea, Woolwich, South East Marylebone and a volume on Oxford Street. He is a prolific author of journal articles and books.

Selected publications
Richard Norman Shaw. Yale University Press, New Haven, 1976. 
The Image of the Architect. Yale University Press, New Haven, 1983. 
Towards a Social Architecture: the role of school-building in post-war England. New Haven, London, 1987. 
A Farewell to Fleet Street. English Heritage, 1988. (With Susie Barson) 
Not Buildings but a Method of Building: the achievement of the post-war Hertfordshire school building programme. Hertfordshire Publications, Hertford, 1990. 
London. Stationery Office Books, 1991. (With Elain Harwood) (Exploring England's Heritage series) 
The Chronicles of London. Weidenfeld & Nicolson, London, 1994. (With Gillian Darley) 
Architect and Engineer: a study in sibling rivalry. Yale University Press, New Haven, 2008. 
Cragside. National Trust Guidebook, Swindon, multiple editions.
Politics and the People of London: London County Council, 1889-1965 (editor) Bloomsbury, London, 
Battersea for The Survey of London, Vol 49, Part 1 (with Colin Thom) London 
Battersea for The Survey of London, Vol 50, Part 2 (with Colin Thom) London 
Woolwich for the Survey of London, vol.48 (with Peter Guillery), London London Suburbs (editor) London 2003 St Paul's: The Cathedral Church of London, 604-2004'' (joint editor) London, 2014

References 

Living people
1946 births
Academics of University College London
English architectural historians
Academics of the University of Cambridge